Simon Maxwell Cowell  (born 19 April 1952) is a British conservationist, television presenter, and author best known for hosting the Animal Planet documentary series Wildlife SOS from 1996–2014. He is the founder of Wildlife Aid Foundation, originally titled Wildlife Aid, which is a charitable organization dedicated to the "rescue, rehabilitation, and release of British wildlife".

Biography
In his early life, Cowell suffered from stuttering, and enjoyed singing. He attended the City of London Freemen's boarding school, and took part in multiple choirs and school musicals.

Cowell earned a PhD in biological sciences at Jesus College, Cambridge, and worked a commodities trader through the 1980s. He has two daughters. He and his former wife Jill co-founded the Wildlife Aid Foundation animal rescue and rehabilitation centre in 1983, several years after setting up a wildlife sanctuary on the grounds of his home. The organisation's activities were the subject of the television series Wildlife SOS, and subsequently a Youtube channel series with entries being released to the present day.

Cowell endured a self-described nervous breakdown in 1994, after which he decided to dedicate "all his time" to the Wildlife Aid charity. As part of his efforts as a conservationist and animal-rights activist, he has campaigned for PETA. Cowell has been described as a "forthright, witty character" who is "not averse" to profanity. Costar Ricky Gervais once described him as "David Attenborough with Tourette's".  He was awarded a prestigious Order of the British Empire award in 2006 for his "services to wildlife". As an author, Cowell released a memoir entitled My Wild Life: The Story of a Most Unlikely Animal Rescuer in 2016.

He resides in Leatherhead, Surrey, and Wildlife Aid Foundation is run out of his home.

Health
In July 2022, it was announced through his foundation that in late June 2022 he was diagnosed with an aggressive, terminal form of lung cancer. A donation campaign for his organisation entitled "Simon's Last Wish" was launched on 15 July.

References

External links

1952 births
Living people
English conservationists
English television presenters
Members of the Order of the British Empire
People from Leatherhead
People educated at City of London Freemen's School
Alumni of Jesus College, Cambridge